Lachnothorax is a genus of beetles in the family Carabidae, containing the following species:

 Lachnothorax biguttatus Motschulsky, 1862
 Lachnothorax inornatus Baehr, 1996
 Lachnothorax lunatus (Liebke, 1931)
 Lachnothorax nossibianus (Fairmaire, 1880)
 Lachnothorax philippinus Baehr, 1996
 Lachnothorax pustulatus (Dejean, 1831)
 Lachnothorax tokkia Gestro, 1875

References

Lebiinae